Jacob Ryan Mitchell (born December 22, 2001) is an American swimmer and Olympian. He placed eighth in the 400 meter freestyle at the 2020 Summer Olympics. At the 2019 World Junior Championships, he won a gold medal in the 4×200 meter freestyle relay. He currently competes at the collegiate level for the University of Michigan.

Background
Mitchell attends the University of Michigan, where he is majoring in biology and competes collegiately as part of the Michigan Wolverines swim team. In April 2022, he announced his intent to transfer from the University of Michigan to the University of Florida and compete for the Florida Gators during the 2022–2023 collegiate season.

Career

2019

2019 National Championships
At the 2019 US National Championships in Stanford, California, Mitchell ranked highest in the 400 meter freestyle at second place with a time of 3:48.09, and also ranked fifth in the 1500 meter freestyle with a time of 15:11.52, 25th in the 200 meter freestyle with a time of 1:48.92, and 51st in the 400 meter individual medley with a time of 4:29.50.

2019 World Junior Championships

In August 2019, Mitchell represented the United States at the 2019 World Junior Championships in Budapest, Hungary, winning gold in the 4x200 meter freestyle relay and setting a new world junior record and Championships record for the event with his relay teammates. He placed fourth in the 400 meter freestyle with a time of 3:47.95, seventh in the 800 meter freestyle in 7:54.70, and seventh in the 1500 meter freestyle where he finished in 15 minutes, 16.28 seconds. His swims in the 400 meter freestyle and 800 meter freestyle qualified him for the US National team. His time in the 400 meter freestyle was the fastest on record for an American swimmer 17 years of age.

2021

2020 US Olympic Trials
He placed second at the 2020 US Olympic Swimming Trials in the 400 meter freestyle, with a 3:48.17, missing the Olympic qualifying time of 3:46.78.  On Tuesday, June 15, he swam the 400 meter freestyle during a time trial, going 3:45.86.  His second-place finish, and time trial performance qualified him to represent the United States at the 2020 Olympic Games.

2020 Summer Olympics

At the 2020 Summer Olympics in Tokyo, Japan, Mitchell placed 8th with a time of 3:45.39 in the final of the 400 meter freestyle. In the prelims heats, he swum a time of 3:45.38 to qualify for the final ranking seventh, just 0.07 seconds behind sixth-ranked swimmer and teammate Kieran Smith.

2022

2022 Big Ten Championships
Mitchell swam a 1:32.49 for the second leg of the 4×200-yard freestyle relay on the first day of the 2022 Big Ten Conference Championships in February, helping achieve a second-place finish with a final relay time of 6:14.59. The following day, he swam a 4:18.10 in the prelims heats of the 500 yard freestyle to qualify for the final later in the day ranking seventh. He placed second in the final with a time of 4:12.88. For the prelims heats of the 400 yard individual medley on day three, Mitchell ranked fourth with a time of 3:45.92 and qualified for the final. He lowered his time to a 3:41.39 in the final to finish second. The final day of competition, day four, he placed second in the final of the 1650 yard freestyle with a time of 14:44.22.

Less than one week later, Mitchell placed second in the 400 meter freestyle at the Westmont, Illinois stop of the 2022 Pro Swim Series with a time of 3:51.12. The next morning, he qualified for the final of the 200 meter freestyle with a time of 1:50.86, ranking third overall 0.28 seconds behind first-ranked Patrick Callan. In the final, he placed second in a personal best time of 1:48.63, finishing 0.04 seconds behind first-place finisher Marwan Elkamash.

2022 NCAA Championships
The first day of the 2022 NCAA Championships in late March, Mitchell helped place fourteenth in the 4×200 yard freestyle relay with a split time of 1:34.36 for the second leg of the relay to contribute to the final time of 6:14.56. In the 500 yard freestyle on day two, he placed 46th with a time of 4:21.24. On the third day, he placed 36th in the prelims heats of the 400 yard individual medley with a time of 3:52.73.

2022 U.S. Open Championships
In the evening on the second day of the 2022 U.S. Open Swimming Championships, December 1, Mitchell won the bronze medal in the 400 meter freestyle with a time of 3:49.65, finishing 1.52 seconds behind gold medalist Guilherme Costa of Brazil. On December 2, he won the gold medal in the 200 meter freestyle, finishing 0.77 seconds ahead of silver medalist Zane Grothe with a time of 1:47.38. The following, and final day, he first won the b-final of the 200 meter backstroke with a time of 2:00.75, then tied Hunter Armstrong in the b-final of the 100 meter freestyle with a personal best time of 50.23 seconds for fifth-place.

Personal best times

Long course meters (50 meter pool)

References

External links
 
 

2001 births
Living people
American male freestyle swimmers
People from Carmel, Indiana
Swimmers from Indiana
Carmel High School (Indiana) alumni
Swimmers at the 2020 Summer Olympics
Olympic swimmers of the United States
Michigan Wolverines men's swimmers